Sandra Myrna Díaz ForMemRS is an Argentine ecologist and professor of ecology at the National University of Córdoba. She studies the functional traits of plants and investigates how plants impact the ecosystem.

Díaz is a senior member of the National Scientific and Technical Research Council and the National Academy of Sciences of Argentina. She is one of the 1% most cited scientists in the world. She was elected a Foreign Member of the Royal Society (ForMemRS) in 2019 and an international member of the American Philosophical Society in 2022.

Early life and education 
Díaz was born in Bell Ville in the province of Córdoba, Argentina. Her parents loved plants and she grew up in a home with big gardens.

Díaz attended the National University of Córdoba and graduated cum laude with a biology degree in 1984. She decided that she wanted to be an environmental scientist, and chose to pursue graduate research. She remained at National University of Córdoba for her doctoral , earning a PhD in biological sciences in 1989. She worked with Marcelo Cabido and Alicia Acosta on plant functional traits. During her PhD and later research Díaz developed the protocols to support scientists using functional traits to interpret ecosystems. Díaz was a fellow at CONICET, the center for ecology and natural resources.

Career and research
After reading a book by J. Philip Grime about the connection between ecosystem processes and environmental factors, Díaz applied to work with him in the United Kingdom. In 1991 Díaz joined the University of Sheffield as a postdoctoral research associate.

At Sheffield she studied how plant communities respond to increasing quantities of carbon dioxide (CO₂). She was the first to demonstrate the impact of carbon dioxide on soils. She found that, even in the presence of fertilizer, weedy plants that grow quickly suffer from heightened levels of carbon dioxide. At the same time, microorganisms in the soil thrived in high levels of carbon dioxide indicating that there is a competition between plants and soil for nitrogen. Diaz also showed that slow-growing plants have a more positive feedback mechanism.

Díaz returned to Argentina in 1993, where she moved back into studying plant traits. She was a principal lead author to the chapter on "Rangelands in a Changing Climate: Impacts, Adaptations, and Mitigation" in the 1995 report of the Intergovernmental Panel on Climate Change (IPCC). Díaz founded the núcleo diversus de investigaciones en diversidad y sustentabilidad.

She has played an important role in the development and implementation of biodiversity. As part of CONICET Díaz developed a new methodology to quantify the biodiversity of plants. This tool allows scientists to evaluate the effect of biodiversity of plants and the impact of ecosystems.  Díaz was the first to provide a global picture of the functional diversity of vascular plants. She designed a database of tens of thousands of plants, using contributions of 135 scientists.

She explored functional trait diversity on plots of land, dividing vegetation into separate sections to simulate changes in climate and land use. She demonstrated that there exists a tradeoff in plant design between the fast acquisition of resources and the conservation of the resources in tissues. Plant designs can include the lifetime of their leaves, whether they grow quickly or slowly, how they reproduce and what kind of wood they have.

Díaz is also interested in social sciences, and looks at how societies value and support ecosystems. Díaz is interested in the relationship between living plants and people. She published a mechanistic framework for connecting functional diversity in 2007, a paper which would go on to win the Proceedings of the National Academy of Sciences of the United States of America (PNAS) Cozzarelli Prize. She used this methodology in real-world systems, and assembled a team of social scientists and ecologists. Social scientists worked with communities to understand what they want from a particular ecosystem, and ecologists studied functional diversity and the relevant ecosystem processes.

Clarivate Analytics reported that Díaz was one of the most highly cited environmental scientists in the world. She is a leader on the Intergovernmental Science-Policy Platform on Biodiversity and Ecosystem Services (IPBES).

 IPBES consists of 150 scientists worldwide.

She was listed as one of the ten people who mattered in science in 2019 by the journal Nature in their end of year review  In 2023 she was one of the six women chosen by Nature to comment on their plans for International Women's Day. The others were Gihan Kamel, Martina Anto-Ocrah, Jess Wade, Aster Gebrekirstos and Tanya Monro.

Awards and honours 
Diaz' awards and honours include:

2008 Ecological Society of America Sustainability Award
2008 Proceedings of the National Academy of Sciences of the United States of America (PNAS) Cozzarelli Prize
2009 Elected member of the National Academy of Sciences
2013 Konex Platinum Award in Biology and Ecology
2014 Bernardo Houssay Award in Biological Sciences
2014 Honorary member award of the British Ecological Society (BES)
2017 Ramon Margalef Prize in Ecology
 2018 Nominated by Nature's 10  as one of five ones to watch in 2019.
2019 Princess of Asturias Awards
2019 Elected a Foreign Member of the Royal Society (ForMemRS)
2019 Royal Norwegian Society of Sciences and Letters Gunnerus Award
2020 BBVA Foundation Frontiers of Knowledge Award in the category "Ecology and Conservation Biology".
2022 Elected an international member of the American Philosophical Society
2023 Royal Botanic Garden Edinburgh Medal from the Scottish First Minister, Nicola Sturgeon

References 

Living people
Argentine women scientists
National University of Córdoba alumni
Academic staff of the National University of Córdoba
Women ecologists
Argentine ecologists
Foreign associates of the National Academy of Sciences
Foreign Members of the Royal Society
Year of birth missing (living people)
People from Córdoba, Argentina